9 Lives is the ninth studio album by Swedish singer Pandora, released in Japan in September 2003, in Scandinavia in June 2005 and Internationally in September 2006. The album peaked at number 16 on the Swedish Charts, becoming Pandora's third top twenty album, and first since Tell the World in 1995.

The album includes Pandora's two Melodifestivalen songs, "You" in 2003 and "Runaway" in 2004, with neither progressing past the semi-finals.

On the album sleeve, Pandora writes; "9 albums in 10 years, I feel so fortunate. This is music that has been in my head for quite sometime waiting... growing... Thanks to all of you who have been following me over the years and welcome to the new listeners".

Track listing

Japanese version
 "A Love Like This" – 3:24
 "Girl in a Daydream" – 2:59
 "Chapter One" – 3:32
 "Tomorrow Comes Too Soon" – 3:45
 "Best Friends" – 4:08
 "I'll Be Gone" – 3:30
 "You" – 3:03
 "When I'm Over You" – 3:41
 "Invisible Girl" – 3:38
 "Been All Around" – 3:59
 "You & I" – 3:20
 "I'm the Better Woman" – 3:11
 "Summer Rain" – 3:59
 "Never Give Up" – 4:19

Scandinavian/International version
 "A Love Like This" – 3:24
 "I'm Confused" – 3:33
 "Runaway" – 2:52
 "Girl in a Daydream" – 2:59
 "Tomorrow Comes Too Soon" – 3:45
 "Best Friends" – 4:08
 "I'll Be Gone" – 3:30
 "You" – 3:03
 "Don't Worry" – 4:00
 "Chapter One" – 3:32
 "You & I" – 3:20
 "Invisible Girl" – 3:38
 "I'm the Better Woman" – 3:11

Charts

Release history

Video games
The songs "A Love Like This" and "Girl in a Daydream" are included in the arcade games Dance Dance Revolution SuperNova, Dance Dance Revolution SuperNova 2 and Dance Dance Revolution X. The Japanese PlayStation 2 version of the first SuperNova game also included both songs.

References 

2003 albums
Pandora (singer) albums